The lac Berthiaume (English: Berthiaume lake) is a freshwater body crossed by the Métascouac River, in the unorganized territory of Lac-Jacques-Cartier, in the La Côte-de-Beaupré Regional County Municipality, in the administrative region of Capitale-Nationale, in the province from Quebec, to Canada. Lac Berthiaume is located in the northwestern part of the Laurentides Wildlife Reserve.

Lac Berthiaume is located between route 169 (connecting Quebec to Alma) and route 155 (connecting La Tuque and Chambord). Some secondary forest roads serve this area for forestry and recreational tourism activities.

Forestry is the main economic activity in the sector; recreational tourism, second.

The surface of Berthiaume Lake is usually frozen from the beginning of December to the end of March, however the safe circulation on the ice is generally done from mid-December to mid-March.

Geography 
The main watersheds near Berthiaume Lake are:
 north side: lac aux Montagnais, lac Sérigny, lac de la Liberté, lac aux Écorces, Rivière aux Écorces, Lac Carbonneau;
 east side: Métascouac Lake, lac Tomachiche, lac Samson, lac Citoleux, lac de la Montagne, lac Érin, rivière aux Écorces;
 south side: Lac des Néréides, Métascouac River, Métabetchouane River, Saint-Henri Lake;
 west side: Robillard Lake, Métabetchouane River, Long Creek, Lac Saint-Jean.

This lake is mainly fed by the outlet (coming from the west) from Lac des Pruches and Robillard, the outlet (coming from the north) from Lake Pérusse, the Métascouac river (coming from the northeast), the outlet from Lake Dyotte, outlet of Atlas Lake. A kilometer-long strait (width: between 100 and 200 meters) separates the northern and southern parts of the lake.

The mouth of Berthiaume Lake is located at the bottom of a bay, the extreme southeast of the lake, at:
  north-east of a curve on the course of the Métabetchouane River;
  south of Métascouac Lake;
  north of Saint-Henri Lake;
  east of Corneillier Lake;
  north-west of the confluence of the Métascouac River and Lac Ouelette which is contiguous to Petit lac Métascouac;
  south-west of a curve in the course of the rivière aux Écorces;
  east of the village center of Van Bruyssel located along the Canadian National railway;
  south-east of Lac Saint-Jean at the mouth of the Métabetchouane River.

From the mouth of Berthiaume Lake, the current follows the course of:
 Métascouac River on  generally towards the southeast;
 Petit lac Métascouac on  towards the south;
 Métabetchouane River on  generally towards the northeast;
 Saguenay River via the La Petite Décharge on  eastwards to Tadoussac where it merges with the Saint Lawrence estuary.

Toponymy 
The toponym "Lac Berthiaume" was formalized on December 5, 1968, by the Commission de toponymie du Québec.

Notes and references

Appendices

Related articles 
 La Côte-de-Beaupré Regional County Municipality, a MRC
 Lac-Jacques-Cartier, a TNO
 Laurentides Wildlife Reserve.
 Métascouac Lake
 Métascouac River
 Métabetchouane River
 Lac Saint-Jean
 Saguenay River
 St. Lawrence River
 List of lakes in Canada

Lakes of Capitale-Nationale
La Côte-de-Beaupré Regional County Municipality
Laurentides Wildlife Reserve